Sally McDermid (born 6 June 1965 in Mytholmroyd, Yorkshire, England) is a former softball outfielder and third baseman from Australia. She won a bronze medal at the 1996 Summer Olympics and 2000 Summer Olympics. She is also known as Sally McCreedy.

References
 sports-reference

1965 births
Living people
Australian softball players
Olympic softball players of Australia
Softball players at the 1996 Summer Olympics
Softball players at the 2000 Summer Olympics
Olympic silver medalists for Australia
Olympic bronze medalists for Australia
People from Mytholmroyd
Olympic medalists in softball
ACT Academy of Sport alumni
Medalists at the 2000 Summer Olympics
Medalists at the 1996 Summer Olympics